Slice of Brooklyn is a reality show on the Travel Channel

It features  Tony Muia running his A Slice of Brooklyn pizza tour, visiting  restaurants in Brooklyn, NY.  His guests include "Frankie Pancakes", "Uncle Louie", and "Fat Sal".  The show premiered March 7, 2012.

References

Travel Channel original programming
American travel television series
2012 American television series debuts
2010s American reality television series